Maurice Pollack (January 28, 1885 – December 16, 1968) was a Canadian businessman and philanthropist.

Early life

Pollack was born in Kanele, Kiev, in Ukraine into a Jewish family. He arrived in Canada in 1902, and settled in Quebec City.

Career
In 1906, at the age of 20, Pollack opened a department store in Saint-Joseph Street in the Saint-Roch district of Quebec City.  The business was successful; M. Pollack Ltd. became one of the largest companies in the region, and Pollock moved into a large house on Quebec City's Grand Allée. In 1950 he set up another store on Charest Boulevard.

The Maurice Pollack Foundation

Having amassed a great deal of money from his commercial enterprises, in 1955 Pollack retired and began to devote his time to philanthropy. He set up a foundation to aid Canadian organizations. Pollack was its president until his death, and was succeeded by his son, Charles C. Pollack.

The Foundation allocated most of its funds to institutions in Quebec, notably to Laval University, McGill University, the Quebec Symphony Orchestra, and the Montreal Symphony Orchestra. In 1966, the Foundation earmarked a fund for the construction of a concert hall at McGill University.<ref>"A Rich History is Exposed". Montreal Gazette",  2009-11-03. Irwin Block</ref>

The Foundation has also funded the Jewish Rehabilitation Hospital in Montreal, and the  Pollack Cultural Centre at Temple Emanu-El-Beth Sholom (Westmount, Quebec).

 Recognition 
The Maurice Pollack Award is presented to individuals in recognition of their efforts regarding equal access to employment for Quebecers from cultural communities and visible minorities, as well as accommodation of ethno-cultural diversity and adaptation of services in the workplace. The award honours two laureates, one in the "public and para-public corporations or organizations" categoryand the other, in the "private sector enterprises or organizations" category.

At Laval University, the student services building, which his foundation helped to set up, is named after him: the Pavillon Maurice-Pollack."La communauté juive de Québec". Prestige, 5 July 2012 - Johanne Martin

Further reading
 Pierre Anctil, Maurice Pollack. Homme d'affaires et philantrophe, en Pierre Anctil, Simon Jacobs dir.: Les Juifs de Québec. Quatre cents ans d’histoire.'' Presses de l'Université du Québec PUQ, Québec 2015, pp 119 – 139

References

1885 births
1968 deaths
Businesspeople from Quebec
Jewish Canadian philanthropists
Businesspeople from Kyiv
People from Quebec City
Philanthropists from Quebec
Emigrants from the Russian Empire to Canada
Ukrainian Jews
20th-century philanthropists
Canadian people of Ukrainian-Jewish descent